Al-Waqi'a ("The Inevitable" or "The Event") is the 56th surah (chapter) of the Quran. Muslims believe it was revealed in Mecca (see Meccan surah), specifically around 7 years before the Hijrah (622), the migration of Muhammad to Medina. The total number of verses in this surah is 96. It mainly discusses the afterlife according to Islam, and the different fates people will face in it.

Summary 
The afterlife (akhirah) is the main topic discussed in the chapter. Picking up from the preceding chapter, Ar-Rahman, which discusses the rewards of Paradise (jannah), this chapter also mentions them and then contrasts them with the punishment of hell. The chapter also distinguishes the three classes of people in the afterlife, "the foremost", "the companions of the right" and "the companions of the left": the first two groups will enter paradise while the companions of the left will go to hell. Here, "the right" is associated with goodness, the righteous will be seated to the right of God's throne and receive their records of deeds in their right hand. The "foremost" refers to a special group of people who will have an even better fate than the companions of the right in the afterlife. Quranic commentators differ on understanding who the foremost is. They variously identify the foremost with the prophets, the saints, the truthful, the martyrs, the first to accept Islam, and others.

Ayat (verses)
1-2 The coming of the judgment-day  inevitable
3-7 Its terrors described
8-11 Its coming shall separate men into three classes
12-39 Joys of the Muslim heaven described
40-56 The punishment of the wicked in hell depicted
57-73 Arguments for the resurrection of the dead drawn from God’s work in creation and providence
74-81 Oath by the stars that the Qurán is divinely-inspired
82-96 Men should believe in God since they cannot save the dying from death

Revelation history 
According to Quranic commentators, the chapter is a Meccan sura, that is, it was revealed during the Meccan period of Muhammad's prophethood. Some commentators, although not in the majority, argue that part of it was revealed during the Medinan period. Some of such commentators maintain that verses 39–40 are the verses that was from the Medinan period, while some say 81–82, and others say 83.

The traditional Egyptian chronology puts the chapter as the 41st chapter by the order of revelation (after Al-Tur), while the Nöldeke Chronology (by the orientalist Theodor Nöldeke) puts it as the 46th. The chapter's position in the Quran, which is not determined by the revelation order, is as the 56th chapter, right after Ar-Rahman which discusses partly related topic.

Exegesis

Q56:22 Houri

According to Ibn Kathir, in paradise there will be, 

In The Message of The Qur'an, Muhammad Asad asserts that the "noun hur - rendered as 'companions pure' - is a plural of both ahwar (masculine) and hawra' (female), either of which describes a person distinguished by hawar', which latter term primarily denotes 'intense whiteness of the eyeballs and lustrous black of the iris'. Asad as well as Yusuf Ali and Marmaduke Pickthall translate this verse as:

The Enlightening Commentary into the Light of the Holy Qur'an says, "the people of Paradise shall have spouses from amongst houri with fair complexions and wide black eyes who are preserved like pearls in shells".

References

External Links
 Surah Al Waqiah Complete recitation with translation
 Surah Al Waqia
 Surah Waqiah Read and Listen

Bibliography 
 

Waqia
Islamic eschatology